The northern variable pitohui (Pitohui kirhocephalus) is a species of pitohui in the family Oriolidae. It is found on New Guinea and a number of neighbouring islands. Its natural habitat is subtropical or tropical moist lowland forests. It is also one of the few known poisonous birds.

Taxonomy and systematics
The northern variable pitohui was renamed from the variable pitohui in 2013 following the split of the Raja Ampat pitohui and the southern variable pitohui.

Subspecies 
Eleven subspecies are recognized: 
 P. k. kirhocephalus - (Lesson & Garnot, 1827): Found on eastern Vogelkop (north-western New Guinea)
 P. k. dohertyi - Rothschild & Hartert, 1903: Originally described as a separate species. Found in Wandammen area (north-western New Guinea)
 P. k. rubiensis - (Meyer, AB, 1884): Originally described as a separate species. Found from head of Cenderawasih Bay to Triton Bay (western New Guinea)
 P. k. brunneivertex - Rothschild, 1931: Found on eastern coast of Cenderawasih Bay (north-western New Guinea)
 P. k. decipiens - (Salvadori, 1878): Originally described as a separate species. Found on the Onin Peninsula (south-western New Guinea)
 P. k. adiensis - Mees, 1964: Found on Adi Island (off south-western New Guinea)
 P. k. carolinae - Junge, 1952: Found in the Etna Bay region of south-western New Guinea
 P. k. jobiensis - (Meyer, AB, 1874): Originally described as a separate species. Found on Kurudu Island and Yapen (off north-western New Guinea)
 P. k. meyeri - Rothschild & Hartert, 1903: Originally described as a separate species. Found on the Mamberamo coast (northern New Guinea)
 P. k. senex - Stresemann, 1922: Found in the upper Sepik region (northern New Guinea)
 P. k. brunneicaudus - (Meyer, AB, 1891): Originally described as a separate species. Found in the lower Sepik region to Astrolabe Bay (northern New Guinea)

References

Pitohui
Pitohui (genus)
Birds described in 1827
Taxa named by Prosper Garnot
Taxonomy articles created by Polbot